The Basilica of Santa Maria Assunta ("Our Lady's Assumption", also called mother church) is a 14th-century basilica in Alcamo, province of Trapani, Sicily, southern Italy. It is named after the Assumption.

History 

The first mother church of Alcamo, positioned on the north side of the quarter of San Vito, was first dedicated to Our Lady Source of Mercy (Santa Maria Fonte della Misericordia, 1200) and then to Our Lady with the Star (Madonna della Stella). This Church is still existing under the name of Santa Maria della Stella, though in a state of abandonment.

In 1332, the inhabitants of quarter of San Vito moved near the castle of the Counts of Modica, and for this reason a new mother church was built in the same place where the present one is located and it is dedicated to Our Lady of the Assumption. This church opened to worship in 1402, was built in a Catalan-Gothic style with a nave and two side aisles and had a wooden ceiling and side chapels not aligned. It was enlarged and modified in 1471, 1530-1558 and 1581.

Today we can only see the bell tower with double lancet windows (restored in 1942), the chapel of the Holy Thorn and the Baptistery.

About the 16th century it gave the name to one of the four districts in which Alcamo was divided, the so-called "Maggiore Chiesa".

In 1602 in this Church they founded the company of Santa Maria dello Stellario (Our Lady of Stellario), formed by countrymen ("villani") and butchers ("macellai"), transferred to church of Stellario in 1625.

The church was rebuilt in 1669 by Archduke Joseph and Angelo Italia  (an architect from the Society of Jesus), while the neo-classical façade was realized in 1786 by Emanuele Cardona.

In 1918 in the mother church they founded the congregation of the Sacramentines, then the congregation of Ursulines (1919) and the Assuntines (1936).

Until the first half of the 20th century, the dome was covered with majolica tiles, later replaced with copper plates. In 1954, year of Mary, on the first centenary of the introduction of the Immaculate Conception's dogma, a  statue of the Madonna was placed on the bell tower.

In May 1969 the Church of Our Lady's Assumption was elected as a basilica.

The garden adjoining the church, since the 15th century,  was used as a cemetery for poor people, with an altar where to celebrate Mass during maladies and a stone cross with an aedicula sacred to Our Lady of Mercy. In the 20th century it became a public garden and in 1929 they placed the War Memorial, realized by Bentivegna, a sculptor from Sciacca.

Description and works 
The church has a basilican plan with a nave and two side aisles which are divided by two rows of columns with monolithic marble shafts extracted from the near mount Bonifato. The stuccoes were made by the Curtis, while the floor was realized on the architect Giuseppe Patricolo's plan.

The interior contains 38 frescos by Guglielmo Borremans; in particular the three frescoes on the vault, realized by Borremans in 1735, represent Our Lady's Assumption with the Holy Trinity and the Saints Anne and Joachim, John the Baptist, David and the patriarchs, Cherubs, Angels and Archangels (in the first space), The Virgin's Coronation with the Eucharistic Word in her bosom, the Holy Trinity and Angels (in the second space) and Our Lady the Queen crowned and sitting among the clouds, holding a sceptre with Saint Peter on the right and Saint Paul on the left and male and female saints who founded religious or monastic orders, with Saint Rosalia (in the third space).
Besides the frescoes, there are other works by Borremans and in particular:
 The Cana's wedding and the miracle of the loaves and fishes (in the side walls of the Holy Sacrament's chapel)
 The Catholic Faith assisted by the Paraclete, crowned with flowers and carried shoulder-high (on the vault of the chapel of the Holy Sacrament)
 The four evangelists with their symbols writing a motto from the Gospel in honour of Mary (in the spaces above the big marble pillars)
 Angels with the pontifical insignia and Saint Peter's Chair supported by four animals of Apocalypse (on the vault of Saint Peter's chapel)
 Melchisedech blessing Abraham, Moses and the crossing of the Red Sea, Elijah making fire to fall on the altar and the Jewish pontiff sitting on Moses' Chair and assisted by his priests while some lepers, prostrated in front of him, are discovering their sores (in the side space under the cornice of Saint Peter's chapel )
 A group of Angels with the instruments of Passions and the Archangel Michael with the shining Cross and surrounded by Seraphs (On the vault of the Crucified's chapel)
 Abel's death, Abraham's sacrifice, the story of the bronze snake and Samson's death (in the side space under the cornice of the Crucified's chapel)
 The Virgin Mary with the Eucharistic Word in her bosom and the Holy Spirit in the shape of a bright flame on her head with angels prostrated, the Virgin in glory on the right of the divine Son passing a sceptre to her and the Paraclete in the shape of a dove between two angels scattering roses waiting the Virgin, beloved bride (on the vault of the greater bigger chapel)
 John, in ecstasy at Patmos, the angel with a golden reed pointing at the celestial Jerusalem in gold and gems with the life tree, illuminated by the divine Lamb's light (in the interior wall above the major door)
 Abigail calming down David's anger against Nabal, her husband, and Booz giving some wheat to Ruth the Moabite (inside the chapel of Our Lady of Rosary)

The Church has 5 chapels in the left nave, 6 in the right one and 6 in the area next to the apse. In the past the chapels belonged to some local families that had the duty of preserving and embellishing them. Besides, they were used by the proprietary families as their graves. They were all noblemen except for the Abbati family.

On the right nave of the church there are:
 The Chapel of Privilege which belonged to the Mastrandrea family and contains the marble altarpiece carved by Antonello Gagini in 1519, with the triptych of Madonna between the Saints Philip and Jamesand Dormitio Virginis in predella and two portraits on canvas with Saint Carlo Borromeo and Saint Philip dating back to the 17th century.
 Saint Lucy's chapel which belonged to the De Ballis family. Inside there are two sarcophaguses: the first is the chapel's founder' tomb (Giovannello De Ballis') and the second is Graziano De Ballis' tomb (his son). There are also two paintings of Don Giovanni and his brother Giuseppe De Ballis, dating back to the first half of the 17th century and ascribed to Filippo Paladini.
 Saints Crispino and Crispiniano's chapel: contains a canvas painting of Saints Crispino and Crispiniano made in 1776 by Tommaso Pollaci.
 The Crucifix's chapel: it holds the Abundance Crucifix, realized by Antonello Gagini between 1519 and 1523. It was made in mixture, and is a copy of another one inside the church of San Domenico in Palermo and realized by the Matinati family.
 Our Lady of Fatima's chapel: it holds a wooden statue by L.Santifaller (1949) and a painting representing Our Lady of Graces made by Giovan Leonardo Bagolino (Sebastiano Bagolino' father) in 1566.
 Giuseppe Rizzo's chapel: built on the architect Paolo Portoghesi's design and unveiled in 1995. It contains a modern architectural work dedicated to don Giuseppe Rizzo (founder of the homonymous bank ) and his mortal remains.

Next to the apse there are:

Instead in the left nave (starting from the chapel nearest to the altar) there are:

The 15th century portal of the bell tower is ascribed to Berrettaro, too. (1499).

See also 

 Sacred Art Museum

References

Sources 
 
 
 
 
 
 
 
 

Santa Maria Assunta
Minor basilicas in Sicily